Ann Augusta Stowe-Gullen (July 27, 1857 – September 25, 1943), was a Canadian medical doctor, lecturer and suffragist. She was born in Mount Pleasant, Ontario as the daughter of Emily Howard Stowe and John Fiuscia Michael Heward Stowe. A plaque regarding her work can be found in Brant County, Ontario.

Medical career
She is best known for being the first woman to graduate from a Canadian medical school (Faculty of Medicine at Victoria College, Cobourg) in 1883. This made Emily and Augusta the first mother-daughter medical team in Canada. Her appeal to Dr. Barrett and other medical people led to the establishment of the Ontario Medical College for Women.

She also had a notable career teaching medical topics at the Ontario Medical College for Women. She was a member of the Ontario College of Physicians and Surgeons, a founder of the National Council of Women and a member of the Senate of the University of Toronto among important roles she carried out during her lifetime. In 1935 she was awarded the Order of the British Empire.

Activism
She was elected a trustee on the Toronto Board of Education in 1892, serving until 1896. Toronto allowed women to run for the Board of Education long before Ontario allowed this elsewhere.  

Stowe-Gullen also helped her mother establish what would later be called Women's College Hospital.

A leading figure in the suffrage movement, she succeeded her mother as president of the Dominion Women's Enfranchisement Association in 1903.

She is known for her quotation "When women have a voice in national and international affairs, wars will cease forever."

She died at her home in Toronto on September 25, 1943.

References

External links 

 The Ann Augusta Stowe-Gullen fonds at the Victoria University Library at the University of Toronto
 Ann Augusta Stowe-Gullen in The Canadian Encyclopedia, and its former Youth Encyclopedia of Canada
 Collections Canada - Pioneer Women Doctors
 No More War Quotes

1857 births
1943 deaths
Canadian feminists
Physicians from Ontario
University of Toronto alumni